Greenfield Township is one of the nineteen townships of Huron County, Ohio, United States. As of the 2010 census the population of the township was 1,374, down from 1,442 at the 2000 census.

Geography
Located in the western part of the county, it borders the following townships:
Peru Township - north
Bronson Township - northeast corner
Fairfield Township - east
Ripley Township - southeast corner
New Haven Township - south
Richmond Township - southwest corner
Norwich Township - west
Sherman Township - northwest corner

The city of Willard borders the southwestern corner of Greenfield Township, and the unincorporated community of Steuben lies at the center of the township.

Name and history
Greenfield Township was organized in 1815.

It is named after Greenfield Hill, a historic neighborhood in Fairfield, Connecticut. Statewide, other Greenfield Townships are located in Fairfield and Gallia Counties.

Government
The township is governed by a three-member board of trustees, who are elected in November of odd-numbered years to a four-year term beginning on the following January 1. Two are elected in the year after the presidential election and one is elected in the year before it. There is also an elected township fiscal officer, who serves a four-year term beginning on April 1 of the year after the election, which is held in November of the year before the presidential election. Vacancies in the fiscal officership or on the board of trustees are filled by the remaining trustees.

References

External links
County website

Townships in Huron County, Ohio
Townships in Ohio